Chryseobacterium nepalense  is a Gram-negative, aerobic, rod-shaped and non-motile bacteria from the genus of Chryseobacterium which has been isolated from oil-contaminated soil from Biratnagar in Nepal.

References

External links
Type strain of Chryseobacterium nepalense at BacDive -  the Bacterial Diversity Metadatabase

nepalense
Bacteria described in 2017